The Men's Freestyle 125 kg is a competition featured at the 2019 European Wrestling Championships, and was held in Bucharest, Romania on April 9 and April 10.

Medalists

Results 
 Legend
 F — Won by fall

Final

Top half

Bottom half

Repechage

References

Men's freestyle 125